Timothy Davies may refer to:

 Timothy Davies (politician) (1857–1951), British Liberal Member of Parliament
 Timothy Davies (judoka) (born 1980), British judoka
 Timothy Davies (runner), British runner

See also
 Timothy Davis (disambiguation)
 Tim Davis (disambiguation)